Glyphidocera carribea is a moth in the family Autostichidae. It was described by August Busck in 1911. It is found in Trinidad.

References

Moths described in 1911
Glyphidocerinae